The Panzerkampfwagen Bär or just Bär was a German military design for a self-propelled gun, devised in WW2.

Development 
The Bär was only designed on paper and did not reach prototype stage. The concept was to make a formidable Assault gun/or self-propelled gun. Its specifications were very much like
that of the Sturmtiger, so it may have been used in that role. The running gear was to be taken from the Tiger tank, but rather than using torsion bar for suspension, it would have used leaf springs.
The gun was very large, so it had limited or no traverse, however, it could elevate.

Specifications 
The vehicle was heavy, weighing up to 120 tons. Overall length was 8.2 metres. The crew consisted of 6 men. The main gun was large, a 30.5 cm calibre H. L/16

References 

World War II assault guns